The 2017 A Lyga was the 28th season of the A Lyga, the top-tier association football league of Lithuania. The season began on 3 March 2017 and ended on 19 November 2017.

All eight teams from the previous season remained and competed in the league, while Žalgiris Vilnius began the season as defending champions having won fourth consecutive league title last year.

Sūduva Marijampolė won the championship for the first time in their 96-year history, becoming the eighth club to win the league since its creation in 1991.

Teams
A total of eight teams should have contested the league, including six sides from the previous season, one promoted from the 2016 LFF I Lyga and the winners of the 2016 A Lyga Relegation play-offs.

Utenis managed to withstand against I Lyga runners-up Palanga in the play-offs and for the 3rd consecutive season continued to play in the A Lyga.

2015 LFF I Lyga champions FK Lietava changed they name to FK Jonava after received permission from Lithuanian Football Federation.

Kauno Žalgiris were relegated at the end of 2016 season and replaced by 2016 LFF I Lyga champions Šilas. It was going to be a debut in the top tier for Kazlų Rūda team. 

Before the beginning of the season, newcomers Šilas were accused of match-fixing during a 2017 Virsligas Winter Cup match with FS METTA. Soon after Lithuanian Football Federation started an investigation to determine validity of these claims. At the time all club trainings and friendly matches were revoked. On 24 February, club chairman Audrius Raškauskas announced, that players received a permission to look for the new clubs while Šilas most probably will withdraw from the league into lower divisions of Lithuanian football.  

On 24 February 2017 Lithuanian Football Federation announced that Šilas withdrew from the league and will be replaced by last year participants Kauno Žalgiris, who were only non-participating team, which received a valid license for A Lyga.

Clubs and locations

The following teams were competing in the 2017 championship:

Personnel and kits
Note: Flags indicate national team as has been defined under FIFA eligibility rules. Players and Managers may hold more than one non-FIFA nationality.

Managerial changes

Regular season

Standings

Results

First half of season

Second half of season

Championship round

Standings

Results

Relegation play-offs
The 7th placed team faced the runners-up of the 2017 LFF I Lyga for a two-legged play-off. The winner on aggregate score after both matches earned entry into the 2018 A Lyga.

First leg

Second leg

Stumbras won 5–1 on aggregate.

Positions by round
The table lists the positions of teams after each week of matches. In order to preserve chronological progress, any postponed matches are not included in the round at which they were originally scheduled, but added to the full round they were played immediately afterwards. For example, if a match is scheduled for matchday 13, but then postponed and played between days 16 and 17, it will be added to the standings for day 16.

Updated to games played on 15 November 2017

Season statistics

Top scorers

Updated to games played on 19 November 2017

Hat-tricks

Attendance

 — Official attendance statistic from one of the Kauno Žalgiris matches was not publicly released.

Awards

Yearly awards
Awards were presented at the LFF Awards ceremony, which was held on December 4. Finalists for voted awards were announced after the season and winners were presented at the award ceremony.

Quarterly awards

"Golden Heart" initiative
From 2016 season A lyga together with Lithuanian Football Federation decided to expand project "Bring you hearts to the stadium" and honor players who played 10 or more times for the Lithuania national team with golden heart on their shirts.

In 2017 season following players have had this evaluation:
Žalgiris  — Egidijus Vaitkūnas, Saulius Mikoliūnas, Vytautas Lukša, Mantas Kuklys, Darvydas Šernas, Georgas Freidgeimas, Linas Klimavičius
Trakai  — Deividas Česnauskis, Valdemaras Borovskis, Arūnas Klimavičius
Atlantas  —  Linas Pilibaitis, Tadas Labukas
Sūduva  — Vaidas Slavickas 
Utenis  — Pavelas Leusas
Kauno Žalgiris  — Ignas Dedura

Furthermore, Karolis Chvedukas was eligible to receive his "Heart" during the season, as he met qualification criterios.

Notes

See also

Competitions
 2017 Lithuanian Supercup
 2017 LFF I Lyga
 2017 Lithuanian Football Cup

Team seasons
 2017 FK Žalgiris season

References

External links
 

LFF Lyga seasons
2017 in Lithuanian football
Lithuania
Lithuania